Ronge may refer to:
Rongé Island, Antarctica 
Johannes Ronge (1813–1887), German priest, principal founder of the New Catholics 
Bertha Ronge (1818–1863), education and religious activist, wife of Johannes
Maximilian Ronge (1874–1953), military intelligence chief in the Austro-Hungarian Empire
Barry Ronge, South African journalist, writer and broadcaster
Walter Ronge, U.S. soccer player

See also
La Ronge, Saskatchewan, Canada 
Lac la Ronge, Saskatchewan
Lac La Ronge First Nation
La Ronge Ice Wolves, a junior ice hockey team
La Ronge Water Aerodrome
La Ronge (Barber Field) Airport
Air Ronge, Saskatchewan